Maurice DuBois (born August 20, 1965) is an American television anchorman for WCBS-TV in New York City and the CBS network.

Early life and education
DuBois was born on Long Island, New York, the son of immigrants to the U.S. from Dominica, an island nation in the Caribbean. He attended Port Jefferson High School, and received a Bachelor of Science degree in journalism from the Medill School of Journalism at Northwestern University in Evanston, Illinois. While in college, he served as an intern at the Public Affairs Office of the Brookhaven National Laboratory on Long Island in 1984 and 1985, where he wrote for the employee newspaper, the Brookhaven Bulletin.

Career
DuBois began his career in 1987, when he worked as a desk assistant at KING-TV in Seattle, Washington. Following that, he served as an anchor and reporter at WFLD-TV in Chicago, Illinois, and later at KCRA-TV in Sacramento, California. He then spent seven years In New York at WNBC-TV, the East Coast flagship station of the NBC television network. While at WNBC, DuBois served as a co-anchor of Today in New York, an early-morning local news and entertainment program. During that time, he also hosted Four Stories – a television news-magazine program featuring community heroes – as well as Mind Over Media, special programming for Court-TV for students to understand media images.

In addition, DuBois worked as a substitute news reader on NBC News's Today and as a substitute co-host and news reader on its weekend editions.

In September 2004, DuBois joined WCBS-TV – also in New York and the East Coast flagship station of the CBS television network – as one of its anchors for the 6pm newscast, CBS 2 News at 6 with Dana Tyler. Since then, he has co-anchored CBS 2 News This Morning and CBS 2 News at Noon with Cindy Hsu and also with Mary Calvi.

In January 2011, DuBois began co-anchoring – with Kristine Johnson – CBS 2 News at 5 and CBS 2 News at 11. He is also an occasional substitute of the weekend edition of the CBS Evening News.

In addition to covering local news, DuBois has worked as a reporter, covering national political conventions, AIDS in South Africa, witnessing a double execution – an experience which DuBois described as "intense", the death of Pope John Paul II and the installation of Pope Benedict XVI.

Maurice often gets a shoutout and mentions on Desus & Mero as they are fans and has had cameos on the show.

Community service
DuBois is involved in various community organizations including serving on three non-profit boards – Pencil; Susan G. Komen for the Cure (New York City affiliate); and New York City Center. He has worked with WNET's GED program.

Personal life
DuBois and his wife, Andrea Adair, were married on August 13, 2001. They have two sons and live in Harlem.

Awards and honors
DuBois has won four Emmy Awards and has been honored by the Associated Press. He also received a Trailblazer Award from the New York City chapter of the National Association of Black Journalists.

DuBois has received honorary Doctor of Philosophy degrees from Briarcliffe College in Bethpage, New York; Medgar Evers College (of the City University of New York) in Brooklyn, New York; Seton Hall University in South Orange, New Jersey and St. Francis College in Brooklyn, New York.

References

External links
 
 

1965 births
American people of Dominica descent
Television anchors from Chicago
Living people
Television anchors from New York City
Medill School of Journalism alumni
People from Suffolk County, New York
People from Harlem
Television anchors from Sacramento, California
CBS News people